The Mystical Marriage of Saint Catherine of Alexandria is a large religious painting by the Flemish artist Michaelina Wautier. It was painted in 1649 and hangs in the diocesan seminary in Namur.

References

Paintings by Michaelina Wautier
1640s paintings
Wautier